Myriad Genetics, Inc. is an American genetic testing and precision medicine company based in Salt Lake City, Utah, United States. Myriad employs a number of proprietary technologies that permit doctors and patients to understand the genetic basis of human disease and the role that genes play in the onset, progression and treatment of disease. This information is used to guide the development of new products that assess an individual's risk for developing disease later in life (predictive medicine), identify a patient's likelihood of responding to a particular drug therapy (precision medicine), assess a patient's risk of disease progression and disease recurrence (precision medicine), and measure disease activity.

History
The global search for the genetic basis of breast cancer began in April 1978  when Dr. Mark Skolnick began his research on family disease and linkages at the University of Utah. Numerous other groups also worked to locate BRCA, including Mary-Claire King, Ph.D., from the University of California, Berkeley where she announced the localization through linkage analysis of a gene associated with increased risk for breast cancer (BRCA1) to the long arm of chromosome 17.

To locate the actual gene, Dr. Skolnick and his colleagues invented a landmark gene mapping technique known as Restriction Fragment-length Polymorphisms (RFLP). Gilbert joined Kimberlin in 1991, and they teamed up with Skolnick to form Myriad Genetics.

In August 1994, Mark Skolnick and researchers at Myriad, along with colleagues at the University of Utah, the U.S. National Institutes of Health (NIH), and McGill University patented and sequenced BRCA1.

The firm then established the first clinical laboratory to commercialize genomic testing. Its capabilities have saved countless lives by informing millions of women about their BRCA1/2 risk. Myriad created the first test to measure the molecular biology and aggressiveness of men’s prostate cancer, devised a method to assess the inherited breast cancer risk of any woman not previously diagnosed with breast cancer, regardless of ancestry, important for addressing racial and ethnic disparities, commercialized a psychotropic test that covers 61 medications commonly prescribed for depression, anxiety, ADHD. Also pioneering the field of DNA-specific medicine, Myriad received the first FDA approval for a lab-developed diagnostic test for use in predicting the responses to a DNA-repair drug.

Acquisitions and Subsidiaries 
In August 2016, Myriad announced it would acquire Assurex Health for up to $410million, expanding the company's genetic testing for psychotropic medicine selection.

In July 2018, Myriad completed an acquisition of reproductive genetic testing firm Counsyl for $375million, expanding the company's testing capabilities to carrier and prenatal screening.

Other subsidiaries of Myriad Genetics include Myriad International and Myriad Autoimmune (aka Crescendo Bioscience).

Founders
The founders of Myriad are Peter Meldrum (past President and CEO of Agridyne and past CEO and President of Myriad Genetics, Inc.), Kevin Kimberlin (Chairman of Spencer Trask & Co.), Dr. Walter Gilbert (Founder of Biogen) and Mark Skolnick (Adjunct Professor in the Department of Medical Informatics at the University of Utah).

Products 
Among the prognostic tests developed and marketed by Myriad is "Prolaris", which uses gene expression profiling to provide a 10-year prostate cancer-specific risk of death. Another prognostic test, marketed as "myRisk Hereditary Cancer", reviews genetic markers correlated with elevated risk of developing any of eight hereditary cancers.

Controversies

Myriad Genetics's patents on human genes became quite controversial. Following the discovery by Mary-Claire King that a gene on chromosome 17 is associated with an increased risk of breast cancer, Myriad attempted to patent this gene. These patents were the subject of scrutiny after Myriad became involved in a lawsuit over its patenting practices, which led to the landmark Supreme Court decision Association for Molecular Pathology v. Myriad Genetics, Inc. which ruled these patents illegal. Because genes occur naturally in every human, in addition to raising moral questions, some believe that patents constitute an obstacle to biomedical research worldwide. Additionally, the discovery of their relevance to breast cancer was funded by the public.

USA:  Association for Molecular Pathology v. Myriad Genetics (2013)
Myriad Genetics was a defendant in the case Association for Molecular Pathology v. Myriad Genetics (formerly Association For Molecular Pathology et al. v. United States Patent and Trademark Office).
Lawyers at the ACLU served as counsel for the plaintiffs. In the suit, medical associations, doctors, and patients sued Myriad Genetics to challenge seven United States patents on genes related to breast cancer and ovarian cancer.

Two of the company's patents on the BRCA1 and BRCA2 genes were ruled invalid on March 29, 2010, by Judge Robert W. Sweet in the U.S. District Court for the Southern District of New York. On appeal, the Court of Appeals for the Federal Circuit reversed the trial court in an opinion dated July 29, 2011 and held that the genes were eligible for patents.

On December 7, 2011, the ACLU filed a petition for a writ of certiorari to the Supreme Court. On March 26, 2012, the Supreme Court vacated the Federal Circuit's judgment and remanded the case for further consideration in light of Mayo Collaborative Services v. Prometheus Laboratories, Inc., in which the Supreme Court had ruled, just six days earlier, that more restrictive rules were required to patent observations about natural phenomena.

On August 16, 2012, the Federal Circuit reaffirmed Myriad's right to patent the genes although they denied rights to patent comparisons of DNA sequences. On November 30, 2012, the Supreme Court agreed to hear a second challenge to the two gene patents held by Myriad. Oral argument took place on April 15, 2013. On June 13, 2013, in  Association for Molecular Pathology v. Myriad Genetics (No. 12-398), the US Supreme Court unanimously ruled that "A naturally occurring DNA segment is a product of nature and not patent eligible merely because it has been isolated", invalidating Myriad's patents on the BRCA1 and BRCA2 genes. However, the Court also held that manipulation of a gene to create something not found in naturesuch as a strand of synthetically-produced complementary DNA (cDNA)could still be eligible for patent protection.

Myriad Genetics has also been involved in litigation in Australia over the patentability of DNA sequences (D'Arcy v Myriad Genetics Inc (2015)).  Regarding BRCA1, the company succeeded in the Federal Court, both at first instance and on appeal to the full court, but in October 2015 lost in a unanimous decision of the High Court, D'Arcy v Myriad Genetics Inc.

See also
 Biological patents in the United States

References

External links 
 Myriad Genetics home page
 Court documents for ACLU suit

1991 establishments in Utah
American companies established in 1991
Biotechnology companies established in 1991
Pharmaceutical companies established in 1991
Biotechnology companies of the United States
Companies based in Salt Lake City
Health care companies based in Utah
Medical genetics
Pharmaceutical companies of the United States
Companies listed on the Nasdaq
Genomics companies